Eendragt can refer to:

Eendragt, Groningen, Netherlands, a regional water authority
Eendragt, Zeeland, Netherlands, a village
Eendracht (1655 ship), also called Eendragt